Beddomea is a genus of air-breathing land snails, terrestrial pulmonate gastropod mollusks in the family Camaenidae. These snails are restricted to South India and Sri Lanka. and three species of its kind have been discovered.

Species
 Beddomea albizonatus (Reeve 1849)
 Beddomea ceylanicus (Pfeiffer 1846)
 Beddomea intermedius (Pfeiffer 1855)

References

Camaenidae
Gastropod genera